Leslie Ellsworth Pugh (September 18, 1922 - February 25, 1979) was an American professional basketball player. He spent one season in the Basketball Association of America (BAA) and one season in the National Basketball Association (NBA) as a member of the Providence Steam Rollers (1948–49) and the Baltimore Bullets (1949–1950). He attended Ohio State University.

BAA/NBA career statistics

Regular season

References

External links

1922 births
1979 deaths
American men's basketball players
Baltimore Bullets (1944–1954) players
Basketball players from Ohio
Centers (basketball)
Forwards (basketball)
Ohio State Buckeyes men's basketball players
People from Richland County, Ohio
Providence Steamrollers players
Undrafted National Basketball Association players